Hermann Haller (24 December 1880 – 23 November 1950) was a Swiss sculptor.

His former studio in Zurich can be visited.

Works
Hans Waldmann equestrian statue (1937) at Münsterhof in Zürich, commissioned work by the Kämbel guild
Mädchen mit erhobenen Händen (1939) in Zürich
Oskar Bider memorial (1924) in Bern
Belvoirpark fountain statue (1923) in Zürich
Schauende (1922) in Köln, Rheinparkweg

References

External links

1880 births
1950 deaths
20th-century Swiss sculptors
20th-century Swiss male artists